Paper is a thin sheet material produced by mechanically or chemically processing cellulose fibres derived from wood, rags, grasses or other vegetable sources in water, draining the water through fine mesh leaving the fibre evenly distributed on the surface, followed by pressing and drying. Although paper was originally made in single sheets by hand, almost all is now made on large machines—some making reels 10 metres wide, running at 2,000 metres per minute and up to 600,000 tonnes a year. It is a versatile material with many uses, including printing, painting, graphics, signage, design, packaging, decorating, writing, and cleaning. It may also be used as filter paper, wallpaper, book endpaper, conservation paper, laminated worktops, toilet tissue, or currency and security paper, or in a number of industrial and construction processes.

The papermaking process developed in east Asia, probably China, at least as early as 105 CE, by the Han court eunuch Cai Lun, although the earliest archaeological fragments of paper derive from the 2nd century BCE in China. The modern pulp and paper industry is global, with China leading its production and the United States following.

History

The oldest known archaeological fragments of the immediate precursor to modern paper date to the 2nd century BCE in China. The pulp papermaking process is ascribed to Cai Lun, a 2nd-century CE Han court eunuch.

It has been said that knowledge of papermaking was passed to the Islamic world after the Battle of Talas in 751 CE when two Chinese papermakers were captured as prisoners. Although the veracity of this story is uncertain, paper started to be made in Samarkand soon after. In the 13th century, the knowledge and uses of paper spread from the Middle East to medieval Europe, where the first water-powered paper mills were built. Because paper was introduced to the West through the city of Baghdad, it was first called bagdatikos. In the 19th century, industrialization greatly reduced the cost of manufacturing paper. In 1844, the Canadian inventor Charles Fenerty and the German inventor Friedrich Gottlob Keller independently developed processes for pulping wood fibres.

Early sources of fibre

Before the industrialisation of paper production the most common fibre source was recycled fibres from used textiles, called rags. The rags were from hemp, linen and cotton. A process for removing printing inks from recycled paper was invented by German jurist Justus Claproth in 1774. Today this method is called deinking. It was not until the introduction of wood pulp in 1843 that paper production was not dependent on recycled materials from ragpickers.

Etymology

The word paper is etymologically derived from Latin , which comes from the Greek , the word for the  plant. Papyrus is a thick, paper-like material produced from the pith of the  plant, which was used in ancient Egypt and other Mediterranean cultures for writing before the introduction of paper. Although the word paper is etymologically derived from papyrus, the two are produced very differently and the development of the first is distinct from the development of the second. Papyrus is a lamination of natural plant fibre, while paper is manufactured from fibres whose properties have been changed by maceration.

Papermaking

Chemical pulping

To make pulp from wood, a chemical pulping process separates lignin from cellulose fibre. A cooking liquor is used to dissolve the lignin, which is then washed from the cellulose; this preserves the length of the cellulose fibres. Paper made from chemical pulps are also known as wood-free papers (not to be confused with tree-free paper); this is because they do not contain lignin, which deteriorates over time. The pulp can also be bleached to produce white paper, but this consumes 5% of the fibres. Chemical pulping processes are not used to make paper made from cotton, which is already 90% cellulose.

There are three main chemical pulping processes: the sulfite process dates back to the 1840s and was the dominant method before the second world war. The kraft process, invented in the 1870s and first used in the 1890s, is now the most commonly practised strategy; one of its advantages is the chemical reaction with lignin produces heat, which can be used to run a generator. Most pulping operations using the kraft process are net contributors to the electricity grid or use the electricity to run an adjacent paper mill. Another advantage is that this process recovers and reuses all inorganic chemical reagents. Soda pulping is another specialty process used to pulp straws, bagasse and hardwoods with high silicate content.

Mechanical pulping
There are two major mechanical pulps: thermomechanical pulp (TMP) and groundwood pulp (GW). In the TMP process, wood is chipped and then fed into steam-heated refiners, where the chips are squeezed and converted to fibres between two steel discs. In the groundwood process, debarked logs are fed into grinders where they are pressed against rotating stones to be made into fibres. Mechanical pulping does not remove the lignin, so the yield is very high, > 95%; however, lignin causes the paper thus produced to turn yellow and become brittle over time. Mechanical pulps have rather short fibres, thus producing weak paper. Although large amounts of electrical energy are required to produce mechanical pulp, it costs less than the chemical kind.

De-inked pulp
Paper recycling processes can use either chemically or mechanically produced pulp; by mixing it with water and applying mechanical action the hydrogen bonds in the paper can be broken and fibres separated again. Most recycled paper contains a proportion of virgin fibre for the sake of quality; generally speaking, de-inked pulp is of the same quality or lower than the collected paper it was made from.

There are three main classifications of recycled fibre:
 Mill broke or internal mill waste – This incorporates any substandard or grade-change paper made within the paper mill itself, which then goes back into the manufacturing system to be re-pulped back into paper. Such out-of-specification paper is not sold and is therefore often not classified as genuine reclaimed recycled fibre; however most paper mills have been reusing their own waste fibre for many years, long before recycling became popular.
 Preconsumer waste – This is offcut and processing waste, such as guillotine trims and envelope blank waste; it is generated outside the paper mill and could potentially go to landfill, and is a genuine recycled fibre source; it includes de-inked preconsumer waste (recycled material that has been printed but did not reach its intended end use, such as waste from printers and unsold publications).
 Postconsumer waste – This is fibre from paper that has been used for its intended end use and includes office waste, magazine papers and newsprint. As the vast majority of this material has been printed – either digitally or by more conventional means such as lithography or rotogravure – it will either be recycled as printed paper or go through a de-inking process first.

Recycled papers can be made from 100% recycled materials or blended with virgin pulp, although they are (generally) not as strong nor as bright as papers made from the latter.

Additives
Besides the fibres, pulps may contain fillers such as chalk or china clay, which improve its characteristics for printing or writing. Additives for sizing purposes may be mixed with it or applied to the paper web later in the manufacturing process; the purpose of such sizing is to establish the correct level of surface absorbency to suit ink or paint.

Producing paper

The pulp is fed to a paper machine, where it is formed as a paper web and the water is removed from it by pressing and drying.

Pressing the sheet removes the water by force. Once the water is forced from the sheet, a special kind of felt, which is not to be confused with the traditional one, is used to collect the water.  When making paper by hand, a blotter sheet is used instead.

Drying involves using air or heat to remove water from the paper sheets. In the earliest days of papermaking, this was done by hanging the sheets like laundry; in more modern times, various forms of heated drying mechanisms are used. On the paper machine, the most common is the steam-heated can dryer. These can reach temperatures above  and are used in long sequences of more than forty cans where the heat produced by these can easily dry the paper to less than six percent moisture.

Finishing

The paper may then undergo sizing to alter its physical properties for use in various applications.
 
Paper at this point is uncoated. Coated paper has a thin layer of material such as calcium carbonate or china clay applied to one or both sides in order to create a surface more suitable for high-resolution halftone screens. (Uncoated papers are rarely suitable for screens above 150 lpi.) Coated or uncoated papers may have their surfaces polished by calendering. Coated papers are divided into matte, semi-matte or silk, and gloss. Gloss papers give the highest optical density in the printed image.

The paper is then fed onto reels if it is to be used on web printing presses, or cut into sheets for other printing processes or other purposes. The fibres in the paper basically run in the machine direction. Sheets are usually cut "long-grain", i.e. with the grain parallel to the longer dimension of the sheet. Continuous form paper (or continuous stationery) is cut to width with holes punched at the edges, and folded into stacks.

Paper grain
All paper produced by paper machines as the Fourdrinier Machine are wove paper, i.e. the wire mesh that transports the web leaves a pattern that has the same density along the paper grain and across the grain. Textured finishes, watermarks and wire patterns imitating hand-made laid paper can be created by the use of appropriate rollers in the later stages of the machine.

Wove paper does not exhibit "laidlines", which are small regular lines left behind on paper when it was handmade in a mould made from rows of metal wires or bamboo. Laidlines are very close together. They run perpendicular to the "chainlines", which are further apart. Handmade paper similarly exhibits "deckle edges", or rough and feathery borders.

Applications

Paper can be produced with a wide variety of properties, depending on its intended use.

Published, written, or informational items

 For representing value: paper money, bank note, cheque, security (see security paper), voucher, ticket
 For storing information: book, notebook, graph paper, punched card, photographic paper
 For published materials, publications, and reading materials: books, newspapers, magazines, posters, pamphlets, maps, signs, labels, advertisements, billboards.
 For individual use: diary, notebooks, writing pads, memo pads journals, planners, note to remind oneself, etc.; for temporary personal use: scratch paper
 For business and professional use: copier paper, ledger paper, typing paper, computer printer paper. Specialized paper for forms and documents such as invoices, receipts, tickets, vouchers, bills, contracts, official forms, agreements. 
 For communication: between individuals and/or groups of people:  letter, post cards, airmail, telegrams, newsprint, card stock
 For organizing and sending documents: envelopes, file folders, packaging, pocket folders, partition folders. 
 For artistic works and uses; drawing paper, pastels, water color paintings, sketch pads, charcoal drawings, 
 For special printed items using more elegant forms of paper; stationery, parchment,

Packaging and industrial uses
 For packaging: corrugated box, paper bag, envelope, wrapping paper, paper string
 For cleaning: toilet paper, paper towels, facial tissue.
 For food utensils and containers: wax paper, paper plates and paper cups,  beverage cartons, tea bags, condiments, food packaging, coffee filters, cupcake cups. 
 For construction: papier-mâché, origami paper, paper planes, quilling, paper honeycomb, sandpaper, used as a core material in composite materials, paper engineering, construction paper, paper yarn, and paper clothing
 For other uses: emery paper, blotting paper, litmus paper, universal indicator paper, paper chromatography, electrical insulation paper (see also fishpaper), filter paper, wallpaper

It is estimated that paper-based storage solutions captured 0.33% of the total in 1986 and only 0.007% in 2007, even though in absolute terms the world's capacity to store information on paper increased from 8.7 to 19.4 petabytes. It is estimated that in 1986 paper-based postal letters represented less than 0.05% of the world's telecommunication capacity, with sharply decreasing tendency after the massive introduction of digital technologies.

Paper has a major role in the visual arts. It is used by itself to form two- and three-dimensional shapes and collages. It has also evolved to being a structural material used in furniture design. Watercolor paper has a long history of production and use.

Types, thickness and weight

The thickness of paper is often measured by caliper, which is typically given in thousandths of an inch in the United States and in micrometres (µm) in the rest of the world.

Paper is often characterized by weight. In the United States, the weight is the weight of a ream (bundle of 500 sheets) of varying "basic sizes" before the paper is cut into the size it is sold to end customers. For example, a ream of 20 lb,  paper weighs 5 pounds because it has been cut from larger sheets into four pieces. In the United States, printing paper is generally 20 lb, 24 lb, 28 lb, or 32 lb at most. Cover stock is generally 68 lb, and 110 lb or more is considered card stock.

In Europe and other regions using the ISO 216 paper-sizing system, the weight is expressed in grams per square metre (g/m2 or usually gsm) of the paper. Printing paper is generally between 60 gsm and 120 gsm. Anything heavier than 160 gsm is considered card. The weight of a ream therefore depends on the dimensions of the paper and its thickness.

Most commercial paper sold in North America is cut to standard paper sizes based on customary units and is defined by the length and width of a sheet of paper.

The ISO 216 system used in most other countries is based on the surface area of a sheet of paper, not on a sheet's width and length. It was first adopted in Germany in 1922 and generally spread as nations adopted the metric system. The largest standard size paper is A0 (A zero), measuring one square metre (approx. 1189 × 841 mm). A1 is half the size of a sheet of A0 (i.e., 594 mm × 841 mm), such that two sheets of A1 placed side by side are equal to one sheet of A0. A2 is half the size of a sheet of A1, and so forth. Common sizes used in the office and the home are A4 and A3 (A3 is the size of two A4 sheets).

Paper may be classified into seven categories:
 Printing papers of wide variety.
 Wrapping papers for the protection of goods and merchandise. This includes wax and kraft papers.
 Writing paper suitable for stationery requirements. This includes ledger, bank, and bond paper.
 Blotting papers containing little or no size.
 Drawing papers usually with rough surfaces used by artists and designers, including cartridge paper.
 Handmade papers including most decorative papers, Ingres papers, Japanese paper and tissues, all characterized by lack of grain direction.
 Specialty papers including cigarette paper, toilet tissue, and other industrial papers.

Some paper types include:

 Bank paper
 Banana paper
 Bond paper
 Book paper
 Coated paper: glossy and matte surface
 Construction paper/sugar paper
 Cotton paper
 Fish paper (vulcanized fibres for electrical insulation)
 Inkjet paper
 Kraft paper
 Laid paper
 Leather paper
 Mummy paper
 Oak tag paper
 Sandpaper
 Troublewit, specially pleated paper
 Tyvek paper
 Wallpaper
 Washi
 Waterproof paper
 Wax paper
 Wove paper
 Xuan paper

Paper stability

Much of the early paper made from wood pulp contained significant amounts of alum, a variety of aluminium sulfate salt that is significantly acidic. Alum was added to paper to assist in sizing, making it somewhat water resistant so that inks did not "run" or spread uncontrollably. Early papermakers did not realize that the alum they added liberally to cure almost every problem encountered in making their product would be eventually detrimental. The cellulose fibres that make up paper are hydrolyzed by acid, and the presence of alum eventually degrades the fibres until the acidic paper disintegrates in a process known as "slow fire". Documents written on rag paper are significantly more stable. The use of non-acidic additives to make paper is becoming more prevalent, and the stability of these papers is less of an issue.

Paper made from mechanical pulp contains significant amounts of lignin, a major component in wood. In the presence of light and oxygen, lignin reacts to give yellow materials, which is why newsprint and other mechanical paper yellows with age. Paper made from bleached kraft or sulfite pulps does not contain significant amounts of lignin and is therefore better suited for books, documents and other applications where whiteness of the paper is essential.

Paper made from wood pulp is not necessarily less durable than a rag paper. The aging behaviour of a paper is determined by its manufacture, not the original source of the fibres. Furthermore, tests sponsored by the Library of Congress prove that all paper is at risk of acid decay, because cellulose itself produces formic, acetic, lactic and oxalic acids.

Mechanical pulping yields almost a tonne of pulp per tonne of dry wood used, which is why mechanical pulps are sometimes referred to as "high yield" pulps. With almost twice the yield as chemical pulping, mechanical pulps is often cheaper. Mass-market paperback books and newspapers tend to use mechanical papers. Book publishers tend to use acid-free paper, made from fully bleached chemical pulps for hardback and trade paperback books.

Environmental impact 

The production and use of paper has a number of adverse effects on the environment.

Worldwide consumption of paper has risen by 400% in the past 40 years leading to increase in deforestation, with 35% of harvested trees being used for paper manufacture. Most paper companies also plant trees to help regrow forests. Logging of old growth forests accounts for less than 10% of wood pulp, but is one of the most controversial issues.

Paper waste accounts for up to 40% of total waste produced in the United States each year, which adds up to 71.6 million tons of paper waste per year in the United States alone. The average office worker in the US prints 31 pages every day. Americans also use in the order of 16 billion paper cups per year.

Conventional bleaching of wood pulp using elemental chlorine produces and releases into the environment large amounts of chlorinated organic compounds, including chlorinated dioxins. Dioxins are recognized as a persistent environmental pollutant, regulated internationally by the Stockholm Convention on Persistent Organic Pollutants. Dioxins are highly toxic, and health effects on humans include reproductive, developmental, immune and hormonal problems. They are known to be carcinogenic. Over 90% of human exposure is through food, primarily meat, dairy, fish and shellfish, as dioxins accumulate in the food chain in the fatty tissue of animals.

The paper pulp and print industries emitted together about 1% of world Greenhouse-gas emissions in 2010 and about 0.9% in 2012, but less than screens: digital technologies emitted approximately 4% of world Greenhouse-gas emissions in the year 2019 and the number can be two times larger by 2025.

Future 
Some manufacturers have started using a new, significantly more environmentally friendly alternative to expanded plastic packaging. Made out of paper, and known commercially as PaperFoam, the new packaging has mechanical properties very similar to those of some expanded plastic packaging, but is biodegradable and can also be recycled with ordinary paper.

With increasing environmental concerns about synthetic coatings (such as PFOA) and the higher prices of hydrocarbon based petrochemicals, there is a focus on zein (corn protein) as a coating for paper in high grease applications such as popcorn bags.

Also, synthetics such as Tyvek and Teslin have been introduced as printing media as a more durable material than paper.

See also

Citations

General references 
 
 
 "Document Doubles" in ARCHIVED – Introduction – Detecting the Truth. Fakes, Forgeries and Trickery – Library and Archives Canada, a virtual museum exhibition at Library and Archives Canada

Further reading
 
 "Paper Brightness, Whiteness & Shade: Definitions and Differences" by David Rogers (June 26, 2015)

External links 

 Technical Association of the Pulp and Paper Industry (TAPPI) official website
 The Arnold Yates Paper collection at University of Maryland Libraries
 "How is paper made?" at The Straight Dope, 22 November 2005
 Thirteen-minute video on modern paper production system, from Sappi

 
Papermaking
Chinese inventions